The Southern League Manager of the Year Award is an annual award given to the best manager in Minor League Baseball's Southern League based on their regular-season performance as voted on by league managers. Broadcasters, Minor League Baseball executives, and members of the media have previously voted as well. Though the league was established in 1964, the award was not created until 1972. After the cancellation of the 2020 season, the league was known as the Double-A South in 2021 before reverting to the Southern League name in 2022.

Two managers have won the award on multiple occasions. John Shoemaker won in 2001 and 2006, while Andy Green won back-to-back in 2013 and 2014.

Seven managers from the Jacksonville Suns have been selected for the Manager of the Year Award, more than any other team in the league, followed by the Birmingham Barons and Orlando Cubs (5); the Chattanooga Lookouts, Greenville Braves, Huntsville Stars, Tennessee Smokies, and Mobile BayBears (4); the Columbus Astros and Jackson Generals (3); the Biloxi Shuckers, Mississippi Braves, and Montgomery Biscuits (2); and the Montgomery Rebels, Nashville Sounds, Rocket City Trash Pandas, and Savannah Braves (1).

Seven managers from the Atlanta Braves Major League Baseball (MLB) organization have won the award, more than any other, followed by the Chicago White Sox organization (6); the Minnesota Twins organization (5); the Chicago Cubs and Milwaukee Brewers organizations (4); the Arizona Diamondbacks, Houston Astros, Oakland Athletics, and Washington Nationals organizations (3); the Cincinnati Reds, Detroit Tigers, Kansas City Royals, Los Angeles Dodgers, and Tampa Bay Rays  and the Los Angeles Angels, New York Yankees, San Diego Padres, Seattle Mariners, and Toronto Blue Jays organizations (1).

Winners

Wins by team

Active Southern League teams appear in bold.

Wins by organization

Active Southern League–Major League Baseball affiliations appear in bold.

Notes

References
Specific

General

Awards established in 1972
Minor league baseball coaching awards
Manager